WFMW (730 AM) is a radio station  broadcasting a classic country format. Licensed to Madisonville, Kentucky, United States.  The station is currently owned by Sound Broadcasters, Inc. and features programming from CBS Radio.

Programming on WFMW includes Madisonville Maroons high school sports, a tradio program called "Tell & Sell," a sports-talk program called "Kentucky Sports Radio," Country Gold with Randy Owen, The Country Oldies Show, Classic Country Rewind, and Looking Up Country with Johnny Stone. The local airstaff includes Danny Koeber, Pat Ballard and Kevin O'Connor.

References

External links

FMW